Vyacheslav Ivanovich Zof (Russian: Вячеслав Иванович Зоф) (6 January 1890  – 20 June 1937) was a Soviet military figure and statesman of Czech descent.

Biography 
Zof joined the revolutionary movement in 1910. Three years later he became a member of the Russian Social Democratic Labour Party (RSDLP). During World War I, Zof worked as a fitter at an arms factory in Sestroretsk, where he was in charge of the Bolshevist underground. After the February Revolution in 1917, Zof led the Bolsheviks' organization in Sestroretsk and was a deputy of the Petrograd Soviet.

In July 1917, he prepared fake identity papers for Vladimir Lenin and organized his move from Petrograd to Razliv at the request of the RSDLP Central Committee. Zof would then establish contact between Lenin and the Central Committee.

In 1918–1919, he was appointed brigade and division commissar and supplies manager for the 3rd Army of the Eastern Front. In 1919–1920, Zof was a member of the Revolutionary Military Council of the Baltic Fleet and a member of the Petrograd defense committee. In 1921–1924, he held a post of a commissar at the office of the commander-in-chief of the naval forces of the Republic. Between December 1924 and 1926, Zof was the commander of the naval forces and member of the Revolutionary Military Council of the USSR. In 1927–1929, he headed the Sovtorgflot (Soviet Commercial Fleet) office. In 1930–1931, Zof was a deputy People's Commissar of Railroad Transportation. In 1931, he was appointed first deputy People's Commissar of Water Transportation.

Later Zof fell into disgrace and was appointed director of the "Kompresor" factory in Moscow. In 1937, he was arrested and sentenced to death by the Military Collegium of the Supreme Court of the USSR on June 19 on accounts of being involved in an "anti-Soviet terrorist organisation". Zof was executed the next day.

He was posthumously rehabilitated in 1956.

Awards 
 Order of the Red Banner.

References

External link

1890 births
1937 deaths
People from Dubno
People from Volhynian Governorate
Old Bolsheviks
Russian Social Democratic Labour Party members
Soviet politicians
Soviet Navy officers
People of the Russian Revolution
Soviet military personnel of the Russian Civil War
Recipients of the Order of the Red Banner
Great Purge victims from Ukraine
Soviet rehabilitations
People from the Russian Empire of Czech descent
Ukrainian people of Czech descent
Soviet people of Czech descent